Bee Group Newspapers are a family of suburban newspapers published in Western New York by Bee Publishing, Incorporated, of Williamsville. The forerunner of the corporation began in 1877 with the founding of the Lancaster Bee.  Bee Group Newspapers publishes newspapers for Erie County, New York, targeting towns, villages, and school districts. The weekly readership is 175,672. All papers include local government news, their award-winning classified sections, and special themed sections produced throughout the year. Bee Group Newspapers are members of the New York Press Association and the National Newspaper Association. The Amherst Bee and Cheektowaga Bee are still paid circulation newspapers that are mail-delivered weekly to subscribers.

Individual Newspapers

Lancaster Bee
The Lancaster Bee serves Lancaster, New York. It was founded February 8, 1878, as the Lancaster Star by with Paul Bussmaan and William B. Fuller as editors and publishers. A month later. Fuller assumed the entire ownership, and a year later, publication was discontinued. On May 26. 1880, E. R. Vaughn and P.J. Gaudy issued the first edition of the Lancaster Times, and in 1885, Adam L. Rinewalt, then publisher of the Amherst Bee, took over the ownership of the Lancaster paper.  Later in the same year the publication was sold to Marvin L. Reist (1862–1908), who published it until 1907, when it was sold to W. C. Naylor of Olean, New York.

Amherst Bee 
Founded in 1879 in Williamsville, New York, by Adam Lorenzo Rinewalt (1849–1902), who edited it until shortly before his death. It is the flagship paper of Bee Group Newspapers and is published weekly on Wednesday. The Amherst Bee is free at over 150 locations in Amherst, New York. Amherst Bee celebrated their 125th year of publication in 2004.

Depew Bee 
Serving Depew, it was founded in 1893. It is published every Thursday.

Clarence Bee 
Has served Clarence since 1937. It is published every Wednesday.

Ken-Ton Bee 
The Ken-ton Bee serves the village of Kenmore and the town of Tonawanda, New York, was founded in 1982. It is published every Wednesday.

Cheektowaga Bee 
The Cheektoaga Bee serves Cheektowaga. It was founded in 1977 and is one of two paid weeklies in the Bee family.

Other Publications 
West Seneca Bee, serving West Seneca, was founded in 1980. It is published every Thursday.

Orchard Park Bee, serving the Orchard Park, was founded in 1986. It is published every Thursday.

East Aurora Bee, serving East Aurora, was founded in 1987. It is published every Thursday.

External links

References 

American companies established in 1877
Mass media in New York (state)
Weekly newspaper companies of the United States
1877 establishments in New York (state)